"He Loves Me All the Way" is  a song written by Billy Sherrill, Norro Wilson and Carmol Taylor, and recorded by American country music artist Tammy Wynette.  It was released in April 1970 as the second single from the album Tammy's Touch.  The song was Wynette's seventh number one solo hit on the country charts.  The single went to number one for three weeks and spent a total of fourteen weeks on the country chart.

Charts

Weekly charts

Year-end charts

References

1970 singles
Tammy Wynette songs
Songs written by Billy Sherrill
Songs written by Norro Wilson
Song recordings produced by Billy Sherrill
Epic Records singles
Songs written by Carmol Taylor
1970 songs